Fritz Bondroit (26 March 1912 – 19 September 1974) was a German canoeist who competed in the 1936 Summer Olympics.

In 1936 he won the silver medal in the K-2 1000 m competition with his partner Ewald Tilker.

References
DatabaseOlympics.com profile

1912 births
1974 deaths
German male canoeists
Olympic canoeists of Germany
Canoeists at the 1936 Summer Olympics
Olympic silver medalists for Germany
Olympic medalists in canoeing
Medalists at the 1936 Summer Olympics